My Life Without Me is a 2003 Spanish-Canadian drama film directed by Isabel Coixet and starring Sarah Polley, Mark Ruffalo, Scott Speedman, and Leonor Watling. Based on the 1997 short story collection Pretending the Bed Is a Raft by Nanci Kincaid, it tells a story of a 23-year-old woman, with a husband and two daughters, who finds out she is going to die soon. The film is an El Deseo and My Life Productions co-production.

Plot
Ann  is a hard-working 23-year-old mother with two young daughters, an unemployed husband, a mother who sees her life as a failure, and a jailed father whom she has not seen for ten years. Her life changes dramatically when, during a medical checkup following a collapse, she is diagnosed with metastatic ovarian cancer and told that she has only two months to live.

Deciding not to tell anyone of her condition and using the cover of anemia, Ann makes a list of things to do before she dies. She decides to change her hair, record birthday messages for the girls for every year until they're 18, and tries to set up her husband with another woman.

Feeling a longing to experience a life that was never available to her, she seeks out a man to experience how it feels to be in a sexual relationship with someone other than her husband. Her experiment ends up taking an emotional toll when she meets with a man named Lee, who ends up madly in love with her and is left heartbroken when Ann breaks it off with him. He meets with her one last time and says that he will do anything to make her happy, taking care of her daughters and even finding her husband a new job. She ends their relationship and never tells him that she is dying.

At the end of the film, Ann records a message to her husband, telling him that she loves him, and another one to Lee, telling him the same. She then leaves all tapes that she has recorded with her doctor, asking him to deliver them after her death.

Cast
 Sarah Polley as Ann
 Scott Speedman as Don, Ann's Husband
 Mark Ruffalo as Lee
 Deborah Harry as Ann's Mother
 Jessica Amlee as Penny, Ann's Daughter
 Kenya Jo Kennedy as Patsy, Ann's Daughter
 Amanda Plummer as Laurie, Ann's Friend
 Leonor Watling as Ann, The Neighbor
 Maria de Medeiros as The Hairdresser
 Julian Richings as Dr. Thompson
 Alfred Molina as Ann's Father

Reception

Box office
The film was released on September 26, 2003 and ran for 12 weeks. It grossed $400,948 in the USA and $9,326,006 from markets in other countries, for a worldwide total of $9,726,954.

Critical response

My Life Without Me received generally positive reviews from film critics. Review aggregator Rotten Tomatoes reports a 65% approval rating, with an average rating of 6.32/10, based on 100 reviews. The site's consensus reads: "Sarah Polley keeps this production afloat with her moving performance". Metacritic, another review aggregator, gives the film an average score of 57/100 based on 31 critics, indicating "mixed or average reviews".
Plot of this film is very similar to No Sad Songs for Me (1951, dir. Rudolph Maté), based on the novel by Ruth Southard (New York, 1944).

Accolades
The film won many international and festival awards, including the Genie Award for Best Actress (Polley), the Goya Award for Best Adapted Screenplay (Coixet), and Best Song ("Humans Like You" by Chop Suey).

See also 
 List of Spanish films of 2003
 List of Canadian films of 2003

References

External links
 
 
 

2003 films
English-language Canadian films
English-language Spanish films
Canadian drama films
Spanish drama films
Films shot in Vancouver
Films directed by Isabel Coixet
Sony Pictures Classics films
2003 drama films
Films about cancer
Films about death
Films produced by Agustín Almodóvar
El Deseo films
2000s English-language films
2000s Canadian films
2000s Spanish films
2003 independent films
Canadian independent films